Urosalpinx coombsi is an extinct species of sea snail, a marine gastropod mollusk in the family Muricidae, the murex snails or rock snails.

Description

Distribution
Fossils were found in Eocene strata of Washington, UsA (age range: 37.2 to 33.9 Ma).

References

 J. W. Durham. 1944. Megafaunal zones of the Oligocene of northwestern Washington. University of California Publications in Geological Sciences 27:101 -212

External links
 

coombsi
Gastropods described in 1944
Eocene gastropods